The Land Before Time is a media franchise that began in 1988 with the release of the eponymous theatrical film directed by Don Bluth and featuring executive producers Steven Spielberg and George Lucas. Since then, a number of spin-off material including a television show and a series of video games have been released. There have been 14 games based on the series, beginning with The Land Before Time Activity Center, released in 1997 for Microsoft Windows, as well as a web game formerly hosted on Cartoon Network's website. The educational games in the video game series go from ages 4–8. This series is aimed at players from infancy through first, second, and third grade (ages 4–8). Genres include action platformers, racing games, and early educational games. All characters in these games are voiced by Lani Minella.

Titles

Educational games

Other games

Web game 
A web-based Flash game based on the 2007–2008 animated series called The Land Before Time: Adventure Valley was developed by Yamago, and was previously available on the Cartoon Network website. It consists of five levels, each one based on one of the main characters Littlefoot, Cera, Ducky, Petrie, and Spike. Players control each one using the mouse, clicking it to either make them jump or interact with their environment. The game was eventually removed in early August 2009 when the Land Before Time TV show web page was taken down.

References

External links 
 Land Before Time game franchise at Giant Bomb

Land Before Time
The Land Before Time
Video game franchises introduced in 1997
Land Before Time
Land Before Time
Children's educational video games
Video games set in prehistory